Minja Popović (Serbian Cyrillic: Миња Поповић; born January 23, 1983) is a Serbian former footballer.

Popović scored two goals for FK BASK in the Serbian First League during the 2005–06 season.  He transferred to Ukrainian Premier League club FC Zakarpattia Uzhhorod, where he only appeared in two league matches.

References

External sources
 Profile and stats at Srbijafudbal.
 
 

1983 births
Living people
Sportspeople from Pristina
Serbian footballers
Serbian expatriate footballers
Association football defenders
Expatriate footballers in Ukraine
Montenegrin expatriate sportspeople in Ukraine
Expatriate footballers in Romania
Liga I players
CS Otopeni players
FK BASK players
FK Čukarički players
FK Banat Zrenjanin players
FK Voždovac players
FC Spartak Sumy players
FC Hoverla Uzhhorod players
Serbian SuperLiga players
Ukrainian Premier League players